Discrepancy may refer to:

Mathematics
 Discrepancy of a sequence
 Discrepancy theory in structural modelling
 Discrepancy of hypergraphs, an area of discrepancy theory
 Discrepancy (algebraic geometry)

Statistics
 Discrepancy function in the context of structural equation models
 Deviance (statistics)
 Deviation (statistics)
 Divergence (statistics)

See also
 Deviance (disambiguation)
 Deviation (disambiguation)